Marcel Pavel (born 4 December 1959, in Galați County) is a folk music singer in Romania. His singing talents brought him to the top of the Romanian charts more than once. In 2002, Marcel was elected as The best male voice. His first hit was "Frumoasa mea" by Ovidiu Komornyc. His latest album is "Te vreau langa mine" (I want you near me). One of his  songs: 'Unde esti?'(Where are you?) was chosen as the best song in 2001.

In 2002, he won the national selections for the Eurovision Song Contest together with Monica Anghel. Their song "Tell me why" reached ninth place, the best score ever for Romania at that time.

Pavel was also chosen to dub the singing voice of Claude Frollo from the animated movie – The Hunchback of Notre Dame.

See also
Music of Romania

References

External links
Official website

1959 births
Living people
Eurovision Song Contest entrants of 2002
People from Galați County
Place of birth missing (living people)
Eurovision Song Contest entrants for Romania
Romanian male singers